Water supply and sanitation in Senegal is characterized by a relatively high level of access compared to the average of Sub-Saharan Africa. One of the interesting features is a public-private partnership (PPP) that has been operating in Senegal since 1996, with Senegalaise des Eaux (SDE), a subsidiary of Saur International, as the private partner. It does not own the water system but manages it on a 10-year lease contract with the Senegalese government. Between 1996 and 2014, water sales doubled to 131 million cubic meters per year and the number of household connections increased by 165% to more than 638,000. According to the World Bank, "the Senegal case is regarded as a model of public-private partnership in sub-Saharan Africa". Another interesting feature is the existence of a national sanitation company in charge of sewerage, wastewater treatment and stormwater drainage, which has been modeled on the example of the national sanitation company of Tunisia and is unique in Sub-Saharan Africa.

Access 

In 2015 75% of the population of Senegal had access to an at least basic water source and 48% had access to at least basic sanitation. Concerning water supply, there is a significant gap between urban areas (91% access) and rural areas (63%). For sanitation, access rates display a same significant gap between urban (66%) and rural (35%) areas. In urban areas, 75% have access to water connections in their house or yard and another 17% rely on water kiosks and standpipes. Concerning sanitation, only 19% of the urban population are connected to sewers while another 60% are served by septic tanks or improved household-level latrines.

Source: Joint Monitoring Program for Water and Sanitation of WHO and UNICEF

A key data sources for these access figures is the Senegalese survey as part of the WHO's World Health Survey of 2003. The figure for access to an improved source of water in urban areas reported in the survey (92%) is somewhat lower than the figure reported by the utility SDE and subsequently quoted, among others, by the World Bank (98%).

Service quality 

Water supply in Dakar and most other cities in Senegal is continuous. In 1994, service was still provided 16 hours per day on average. Faced with an increasing demand from newly connected users and constraints on water resources, the private operator initially only distributed the supply interruptions more equitably among neighborhoods in Dakar. However, the average hours of supply per day were increased to 19 hours in 2001 and continuous water supply was achieved in 2006. This was facilitated by the expansion of a water pipeline from Lac de Guiers in 1999.

Concerning drinking water quality, in 2004 97.7% of water samples were in conformity with microbiological water norms, up from 96% in 1996.

Water resources 

Senegal's climate is tropical with well-defined dry and humid seasons. Dakar's annual rainfall of about 600 mm occurs between June and October. The mean annual precipitation ranges from 270 mm/yr in the North to 1793 mm/yr in the South. Interior temperatures are much higher than along the coast.

The largest water resource in the country is the Senegal River in the North, shared with Mauritania, Mali and Guinea. Its average flow is 37 billion cubic meters per year. The Lac de Guiers is an important water reservoir in the Upper Delta of the Senegal River on its left bank with a storage volume of almost 500 million cubic meters. It is a chief source of fresh water for the city of Dakar, hundreds of kilometers to the south-west, through underground pipes. While the water of the Senegal River is abundant, water in most of the rest of the country is scarce. Other major surface water bodies include the Casamance River, the Gambia River, the Saloum River, the Geba River, the Falémé River and the Tamna lagoon near Thiès.

Senegal has about 3 billion cubic meters per year of renewable groundwater resources, excluding those groundwater resources that overlap with surface water. Total water withdrawals in 1987 were 1.4 billion cubic meter, of which 92% is for agriculture, 3% for industry and 5% for domestic uses. Groundwater stocks are estimated at 7 billion cubic meters.

Groundwater overexploitation (overdrafting) is a serious problem in parts of Senegal. For example, Mont Rolland, 70 kilometers from Dakar, used to be famous for its mineral springs. Today, villagers need to drill as deep as 80 meters to pump water. The village's groundwater was seriously depleted by over-extraction by the mineral water company, which closed its doors recently. Almost 80 percent of Senegalese horticulturalists are located around Mont Rolland.

Dakar is supplied primarily with water drawn from fossil aquifers that run the risk of being over-exploited and contaminated by salt water intrusion. Some water is being brought in from the Ngnith water treatment plant on the Lake Guiers through a pipeline whose capacity was increased in 1999. Because of growing demand and the need to close contaminated boreholes, even more surface water will have to be brought from the Senegal River over a distance of about 240 km, which entails high investment costs to further expand the capacity of the existing pipeline. The additional volume of water that would be abstracted from the Senegal River is expected to gradually increase from 0.5 m3/s to about 6.0 m3/s in 2030. The required needs are well within Senegal's water rights under the agreements with neighboring countries. However, abstraction of such large quantities of water would have a significant environmental impact on the Lake Guiers and the Senegal River Delta. Furthermore, future low-flow situations of the Senegal River are difficult to predict in the light of climate change and uncertainties about the operations of the Manantali Dam.

Most of the wastewater of Dakar is discharged without treatment into the Atlantic Ocean. Cambérène wastewater treatment plant, the largest facility in operation in the country, treats about 15 percent of the wastewater generated in Dakar. Since 2007 the station is being operated and expanded by the French company SAUR. Some of the treated wastewater is being reused. As of 2007, reuse was being practiced for a golf course and was envisaged for the irrigation of trees, green spaces and vegetable gardens after tertiary treatment.

Infrastructure 

Sanitation In 2005 ONAS operated a sewer network of 773 km, 57 sewage pumping stations, 7 wastewater treatment plants, and had 70,931 subscribers in Dakar, Saint-Louis, Rufisque, Louga, Thiès, Saly and Kaolack. It also operated 113 km of stormwater drains and 7 stormwater pumping stations in Dakar and 4 towns.

Responsibility for water supply and sanitation

Policy 

The Ministère de l'Urbanisme, de l'Habitat, de l'Hydraulique urbaine, de l'Hygiène publique et de l'Assainissement is in charge of policy setting for urban water supply and sanitation.

The Ministère de l'Hydraulique rurale et du Réseau hydrographique national is in charge of rural water supply. These responsibilities were previously under the Ministry of Agriculture.

The Ministère de l'Environnement, de la Protection de la Nature, des Bassins de réte PAM) to reach the Millennium Development Goals for water supply and sanitation. The program is not a project, but provides a framework for all stakeholders in the sector. The objectives until 2015 are as follows:

In rural areas:

 Provide sustainable water supply to an additional 2.3 million people, increasing access from 64% in 2004 to 82% in 2015.
 Allow 355,000 rural households to install an individual solution to manage their excreta and domestic greywater, increasing access from 17% in 2004 to 59% in 2015.
 Ensure the sanitation of the most important public buildings through the construction of 3,360 sanitary facilities in schools, health posts, markets and bus stations.

In urban areas:

 Provide house connections to water supply to an additional 1.64 million  people, to reach an access rate of 88% in Dakar and 79% in towns in the interior in 2015, compared to 75.7% and 57.1% respectively in 2002.
 Allow 1.73 million additional people access to sanitation, increasing access from 56.7% in 2002 to 78% in 2015.

 Service provision 

Responsibility for urban water supply is shared between the Senegalese national water company (Société Nationale des Eaux du Senegal (SONES)), a holding company, and Sénégalaise des Eaux (SDE), a private operating company. Initially, the French water company SAUR owned a 51% share in SDE, the remaining 49% being divided between the Senegalese state (5%), private Senegalese individuals (39%) and the employees (5%). As of 2011, SAUR was not listed any more as a shareholder on the website of SDE. Instead its shares are held by the West African infrastructure holding company Finagestion, which in turn is majority-owned by the US-based, Africa-focused private equity fund Emerging Capital Partners.

The Office National de l'Assainissement du Sénégal (ONAS) is in charge of sanitation.

In rural areas, user associations called Associations d'usagers de forages ruraux (ASUFOR) manage water systems supplied by tubewells. The state obliges them to sign maintenance contracts with private companies, in order to ensure the sustainability of the systems. They can also delegate operation of their systems to private operators.

 Innovative approaches 

Among various innovative approaches introduced in the Senegalese water sector over the past decade, the country-wide lease (affermage) contract, the Public-Private-NGO-Community Partnership for standpipes in Dakar, and the use of small enterprises to maintain rural and small town water systems with the support of micro-credits stand out particularly.

 Affermage for urban water supply 
One of the best-known and successful innovative approaches in water supply in Senegal is the lease (affermage) contract signed in 1996. According to the Senegalese government, the number of clients of Sénégalaise des eaux (SDE) increased from 241,671 in 1996 to 638,629 in 2014. Out of almost 400,000 new connections, 206,000 were social connections serving the poorest population, primarily on the outskirts of Dakar.

According to the World Bank, the government was successful at reaching the poor through the establishment of a national fund to allow the private operator to subsidize Social Connections. It aimed at providing improved services to the poor for a lower price. Social connections were free, while a connection fee was charged for ordinary connections aimed at wealthier households. SDE and Senegalese National Society of Water Usage (SONES) worked through a large NGO to identify the need for social connections. In addition, the private operator set up a decentralized and computerized network of payment booths. This made payments by domestic clients easier, and improved customer services. The operator's remuneration was based on the amount of water produced and sold, creating an incentive to serve as many customers as possible while reducing water losses.

A 2006 study by the Boston Institute for Developing Economies (BIDE) estimated the total net benefits of the lease contract at a staggering US$457 million, of which the bulk accrued to customers who received better access to higher volumes of water, and to the government, with only small benefits accruing to the public and private owners of the water company (US$6 million). Losers included foreign lenders (US$14 million) and employees (US$10 million) through lower increases in wages and benefits compared to the period prior to the reform and through a small reduction in employment.

Selection of the private operator The private operator was selected competitively in a two-stage bidding process. Four bidders, all of them French, participated in the first stage: Générale des Eaux (now Vivendi Environnement), Lyonnaise des Eaux (now SUEZ), the Société d'Aménagement Urbain et Rural (SAUR), and CISE (which has since merged with SAUR). 
The two-stage process entailed inviting pre-qualified bidders to submit a first-stage technical proposal that is evaluated, after which each bidder was invited to a meeting to discuss the shortcomings of their technical proposal. A potentially difficult situation arose when SAUR was invited to bid, as SAUR already had a long-standing relationship with SONEES. SAUR had been working as an advisor to SONEES since 1980. The government considered eliminating them from the bidding, but the World Bank did not agree. Instead, SONEES was instructed to finish up all contracts, end all contact, and provide SAUR with no access to their operation four months before the bidding took place. Finally, all four bidders were invited to submit revised technical proposals, accompanied by financial bids. All four bidders responded. Lyonnaise des Eaux was eliminated as the submission was non-compliant. After further discussions, the bid from Générale des Eaux was also eliminated, as they refused to entirely endorse some of the requirements of the contract. The two remaining bidders, CISE and SAUR, were then invited to present second-stage bids. When these were opened on October 25, 1995, SAUR was announced the winner, based on price. SAUR had bid a water supply rate of 236 FCFA per cubic meter, which at the time was 62 percent of the average tariff.

Criticism According to critics, such as the Dakar-based regional NGO Aide Transparence, the number of connections has increased from a much lower base of 203,902 in 1996 to only 264,161 in 2002. This contrasts with SDE figures which state that the number of connections was 338,398 in 2002. According to the report by Aide Transparence, "consumers often complain about a reduction in water quality" and that "the use of mineral water has never before been so widespread in Senegal", without providing any specific figures. It also says that "in certain areas or at certain points in the year" there is no tap water for a whole day or even for several days.

 Community partnership for standpipes in Dakar 

Another innovative approach is the community partnership with SONES, SdE and an international NGO with local roots, Enda Tiers-Monde, to select the location for standpipes, build and to operate them. The program installs metered standposts to serve poor households who previously used polluted well water. The program is demand-responsive rather than relying on supply-side targeting of the poor. Community involvement is strong—they are heavily involved in planning, construction and maintenance, leading to strong ownership and near 100 per cent cost recovery. All standposts are metered—the households pay the standpost operator whilst the operator pays the utility for bulk water. The community itself chooses the operator (or a group of rotating operators) who may work for the community for a salary or occasionally for themselves for a share. There are two types of standpipe schemes—in one SONES fully finances the cost of the infrastructure, in the other ENDA finances the infrastructure. This latter scheme, known as the 'Eau Populaire' program, began in 1995. The SONES scheme has installed roughly 250 standposts, the ENDA scheme roughly 130. In 2001, an estimated 200,000 people had received access to potable water thanks to the 'Eau Populaire' project. The project has led to a significant drop in waterborne illnesses in children. It has also led to the creation of several hundred jobs (standpost operators who receive between 30,000 and 80,000 CFA per month), as well as funding other local projects via standpost receipts.

 Rural water supply 

In rural areas, the government supported the introduction of more sustainable management models for piped water systems using boreholes since 1999 through the pilot project REGEFOR in Central Senegal. Among the innovative features of the project are the use of metering and volumetric pricing, mandatory maintenance contracts with private sector companies and support through micro-credit. The first pilot project covered 80 boreholes. In 2009 a private maintenance company is to be contracted for 621 boreholes in the central area of Senegal, and until January 2010 all the country's 1,400 boreholes are to be under private maintenance contracts.

 History and recent developments 

 First public-private partnership (1960-71)

1960-71: The Compagnie Générale des Eaux du Sénégal, a subsidiary of the Compagnie Générale des Eaux of France is in charge of urban water supply in Senegal under a lease (affermage) contract.

 Public management (1971–mid-1990s) 

1971: Under President Léopold Senghor, an advocate of African socialism, the state nationalizes the water company and creates the national public water company Société Nationale d'Exploitation des Eaux du Sénégal (SONEES). At least in rural areas water is provided for free.

1983: Under President Abdou Diouf (1981-2000), SONEES signs a concession contract with the government. In rural areas, water tariffs are being introduced using flat fees per household in the absence of metering.

1994: The government embarks on a year-long process to design sector reforms, including a series of workshops and advice from the World Bank and an assessment of reforms in other countries.

 Second public-private partnership (since mid-1990s) 

1995: The government decides to delegate urban water service provision to the private sector under a lease contract in its first letter of development policy.

1996: SONEES is dissolved and three new companies are created: Société Nationale des Eaux du Sénégal (SONES), the state asset holding company, Sénégalaise des Eaux (SDE), the private operating company, and the Office National de l'Assainissement du Sénégal (ONAS), the public sanitation company. SONES owns the assets, is in charge of investments in infrastructure, and regulation of SDE. SDE is responsible for operation, regular maintenance, some investment for system expansion, as well as billing and collection. According to the World Bank, good relationships were helped by the fact that no major layoffs were necessary during the reforms, as the utility was not very overstaffed to begin with.

1998: SONES and SDE successfully renegotiate several unattainable targets in the contract without resorting to arbitration or litigation.

1998: A Conseil Supérieur de l'Eau, presided by the Prime Minister, is created to set policies for water resources management and water supply.

1999: The pilot project REGEFOR is initiated in Central Senegal with the support of the French Development Agency AFD with the objective to develop new management principles based on the disengagement of the State in favor of users and the private sector:  metering, volumetric pricing, trained managers and technicians and clear relationships between the different actors. This required a "cultural revolution" among villagers and within the administration, whose responsibility to maintain the equipment was transferred to the private sector.

2000: Change of government after Presidential elections that are won by the opposition leader Abdoulaye Wade.

2001: Second letter of development policy and effectiveness of the World Bank-supported Long-Term Water Sector Project. Water and sanitation policies are pursued without major changes.

2002: Sénégalaise Des Eaux is certified according to the ISO 9001 norm, version 2000, by the French association for quality assurance AFAQ. SdE is the first Senegalese company that has received an ISO certification and the first African company certified according to the ISO 9001 norm based on customer satisfaction management.

2005: Third letter of development policy. The Water and Sanitation Program for the Millennium (PEPAM) is created. In rural areas, the pilot project REGEFOR is completed successfully and its approach is now being introduced at a national level.

2006: The lease contract with SDE is extended by five more years. A performance contract is signed with SONES.

2008: The government signs a performance contract with ONAS.

2009: The government commissions a study to assess, among other issues, whether the lease contract should evolve into a concession contract under which the private company finances some or all of the investments.

2010/11: SAUR sells its share in SDE to the West African infrastructure holding company Finagestion, which in turn is majority-owned by the US-based, Africa-focused private equity fund Emerging Capital Partners.

2011: The lease contract with SDE is extended by two more years.

2012: Macky Sall elected President, defeating Abdoulaye Wade.

September 2013: Dakar's water supply is interrupted for three weeks after a break in a key transmission pipeline at Keur Momar Sarr.

2014: The lease contract with SDE is extended by five more years.

 Financial aspects and efficiency 

The financial policy of the sector, as defined in 1994, is based on the following key principles:

 The only support from the State is in the form of on-lending of donor's financing; there are no ongoing operating subsidies.
 There will be no excessive increases in water tariffs; tariff increases are gradual on the basis of a financial model.
 There is a social tariff (the subsidized first block of the tariff for consumption under 10 m3 per month) in order to ensure affordability.

 Tariffs and cost recovery 

Urban water tariffs SDE applies an increasing-block tariff, which includes three blocks:

 a social tariff for low-consumption users with house connections, defined as those using less than 20 cubic meters every 60 days, which was 191 FCFA/m3 in 2008;
 a regular tariff for consumption between 20 and 40 cubic meters (formerly 20-100 cubic meters), which was 630 FCFA/m3 in 2008; and
 a "dissuasive" rate for any consumption over 40 cubic meters (formerly 100 cubic meters), which was 789 FCFA/m3 in 2008.

In Dakar water is also sold in buckets at standpipes for 30 CFA (US$0.06) per 25 litre bucket, equivalent to US$2.40/m3. Guardians of standpipes are small entrepreneurs who buy water from the utility and sell it to their customers.

The NGO Public Citizen has criticized the tariff structure in Senegal, because the poorest who tend to rely on standpipes pay the highest tariffs, "which amounts to 350 percent of the social tariff". In addition, families in low-income areas may share one connection and consequently consume at the "dissuasive" rate. According to Public Citizen, this leads to a situation in which the poorest families subsidize the water of rich families who use normal amounts of water and qualify for the "social" tariff.

A World Bank study acknowledges that standpipe users pay more for water, noting that the government sees them as a temporary solution and intends to reach all the poor with private connections. However, still according to the same World Bank study, this policy suffers from a "major flaw": the very criteria that make a household eligible for the subsidy more or less guarantee that it is not poor. Social connection programs are intended for stable neighborhoods where the residents have
established themselves. In order to obtain a social connection, an applicant must have title to the
land, and an existing house must be located on it. A household that can afford this, and can afford to build a permanent house, is not among the poorest of the poor.

Price increases have been limited to no more than 3 percent per annum in nominal terms under the performance targets, the same as the rate of inflation, thus keeping tariffs constant in real terms. The average water tariff increased from 350 FCFA/m3 in 1995 (US$0.72/m3 at the exchange rate of 489 CFA/US$) to 496 FCFA/m3 (US$1.09/m3 at the exchange rate of 456 CFA/m3) in 2007.

Cost recovery for urban water All the financial costs for water supply are entirely recovered, which is highly unusual for a water utility in Sub-Saharan Africa. Interest-free long-term loans provided by international financial institutions to the Senegalese government are on-lent to the asset holding company and are recovered from users through the bills issued and collected by SDE.

Tariffs and cost recovery for sewerage A sanitation surcharge of US$0.05/m3 is levied by SDE on behalf of ONAS on water customers in all cities with a sewer network. The surcharge represents six percent of the water bill for households using 50 m3 per month of water. Revenues generated by this surcharge are insufficient to finance ONAS operations and maintain sewerage and drainage networks. Achieving financial sustainability of ONAS and finding means to devote resources for on-site sanitation promotion and development remains a major challenge for the sub-sector.

While municipalities are not responsible for sanitary or stormwater drainage, they are nevertheless supposed to transfer a portion of the property tax (amounting to US$0.5 million) to ONAS, through the equipment fund for municipalities, to finance operation and maintenance of drainage facilities. However, at least until 2001, these resources were not made available to ONAS.

Collection efficiency in urban areas Tariff collection by SDE reached a rate of 98 percent, up from less than 80 percent before the project according to one World Bank source. According to SDE and another World Bank source the tariff collection rate indeed averaged 98% in 2001-2006, but it was only slightly lower at 96% in 1996.SDE: Taux de recouvrement global According to again another source the collection ratio in 1996 was 91%. The lease contract was signed in April 1996.

Tariffs and financing policy in rural areas In rural areas beneficiary communities contribute 20% to initial investments and 80% is financed by the government. Operation, maintenance and replacement costs are to be recovered through tariff revenues.

 Investments and financing 

Investment According to the Senegalese government, financing equivalent to 260 billion FCFA (about US$500 million using the 2008 exchange rate) has been mobilized between 1996 and 2006 through the Projet Sectoriel Eau (PSE) and the Projet Eau à Long Terme (PELT). According to other reports, US$300 million were invested in Senegal's water partnership. According to the World Bank, total project cost for Senegal Water Project (including sanitation) was US$290 million for which IDA provided US$100 million. IDA provided another US$125 million equivalent under the follow-up Long Term Water Sector Project.

The budget of the PEPAM for the period 2005-2015 is 515 billion FCFA (about US$1 billion), including 274 billion FCFA for rural areas and 241 billion FCFA for urban areas.

Financing Most of the investments in the sector are being financed by donors through zero-interest loans from the World Bank's International Development Association and the African Development Bank or grants from other donors, complemented by government counterpart funds. Investments of US$20 million were financed by the private operator over the first ten years of the lease. In 1996, Citibank and the Compagnie Bancaire de l'Afrique Occidentale'' (CBAO) provided a maximum line of credit of 21.4 million US dollars (11 billion F CFA) over six years to assist the asset-holding company SONES with its cash flow.

Efficiency 

Water losses, mostly from leakages, dropped to less than 20 percent in 2006, from 32 percent in 1996. The decline translates to a savings equal to the water needs of 930,000 people. Labor productivity stood at 2.3. employees per 1,000 connections in 2014, up from 6.1 in 1996.

External cooperation 
The World Bank, The United States Agency for International Development (USAID), the African Development Bank, the European Investment Bank, the French Development Agency (AFD), Germany and the West African Development Bank (BOAD) are among the largest donors in the Senegalese water sector.

In 1995, the World Bank provided a US$100 million IDA credit to the government of Senegal to implement its reform plans. It was followed by a US$125 million Long-Term Water Sector Project which became effective in June 2001. In 2006 it also approved a US$7.7 million Output-based aid project to support access to on-site sanitation services in Dakar, implemented by ONAS, the public works agency AGETIP and an NGO.

The European Investment Bank (EIB) has granted two loans (EUR 15 million in 1995 and EUR 16 million in 2001) to the Senegalese Government under the Long-Term Water Project to finance water supply services in Dakar. In November 2007 the EIB signed two additional financing agreements with SONES, in support of Senegal's National Drinking Water and Sewerage Programme for the Millennium (PEPAM). A European Development Fund (EDF) subsidy of CFAF 5.7 billion (EUR 8.6 million) and an EIB loan of CFAF 9.8 billion (EUR 15 million) complete the financing of SONES's total investment programme of CFAF 38 billion (EUR 58 million). Under the project, more than 60 urban centres, including Dakar, will benefit from schemes to rehabilitate, upgrade and extend the drinking water supply network, reaching more than 500,000 people over four years. The planned works comprise the creation of 25 new boreholes, construction of a water treatment plant, extension of the supply network by more than 500 km and installation of 50,000 subsidized connections and 360 standpipes. The four finance providers involved have undertaken to harmonize their procedures, implementing the commitments made under the Paris Declaration on the harmonization of development aid.

Another €64.5 million European Investment Bank loan combined with a €5.55 million European Union grant to the Republic of Senegal is starting in 2023. The funding will provide drinking water to Saint-Louis inhabitants, plus two communities in Senegal's center and south, Kaolack and Kolda.

Saint-Louis will benefit from the following by the completion of the project a new drinking water treatment plant, reservoir units for storage, and the enlargement of the distribution network.This initiative is critical since it is aligned with the African Sustainable Cities Initiative. People will be relocated if there is no water in smaller cities as they seek a better way of life.

The €5.55 million European Union fund, mobilized as part of Team Europe by the European Investment Bank, will assist Senegal's water utility in accelerating its 35000 subsidised drinking water connections for 350 000 consumers across the nation.

See also 
Water supply and sanitation in Sub-Saharan Africa

References

Further reading
 Aymeric Blanc and Cédric Ghesquières: Secteur de l'eau au Sénégal - Un partenariat équilibré entre acteurs publics et privés pour servir les plus démunis ?, Agence Française de Développement, Direction de la Stratégie, Département de la Recherche, Document de Travail n°24, 2006

External links 
Société Nationale des Eaux du Senegal
Sénégalaise des Eaux
Programme d'eau potable et assainissement pour le millénaire (PEPAM)
The World Bank on private water operations in rural communities World Bank report with focus on Senegal.

 
Environment of Senegal